In music, a single is a type of release, typically a song recording of fewer tracks than an LP record or an album. One can be released for sale to the public in a variety of formats. In most cases, a single is a song that is released separately from an album, although it usually also appears on an album. In other cases a recording released as a single may not appear on an album.

Despite being referred to as a single in the era of music downloads, singles can include up to as many as three tracks. The biggest digital music distributor, the iTunes Store, accepts as many as three tracks that are less than ten minutes each as a single. Any more than three tracks on a musical release or thirty minutes in total running time is an extended play (EP) or, if over six tracks long, an album.

Historically, when mainstream music was purchased via vinyl records, singles would be released double-sided, i.e. there was an A-side and a B-side, on which two songs would appear, one on each side.

Early history
The origins of the single are in the late 19th century, when music was distributed on phonograph cylinders that held two to four minutes' worth of audio. They were superseded by disc phonograph records, which initially also had a short duration of playing time per side. In the first two to three decades of the 20th century, almost all commercial music releases were, in effect, singles (the exceptions were usually for classical music pieces, where multiple physical storage media items were bundled together and sold as an album). Phonograph records were manufactured with a range of playback speeds (from 16 to 78 rpm) and in several sizes (including ).

The inherent technical limitations of the gramophone disc defined the standard format for commercial recordings in the early 20th century. The relatively crude disc-cutting techniques of the time and the thickness of the needles used on record players limited the number of grooves per inch that could be inscribed on the disc surface and a high rotation speed was necessary to achieve acceptable recording and playback fidelity. 78 rpm was chosen as the standard because of the introduction of the electrically powered synchronous turntable motor in 1925, which ran at 3,600 rpm with a 46:1 gear ratio, resulting in a rotation speed of 78.3 rpm.

With these factors applied to the 10-inch format, songwriters and performers increasingly tailored their output to fit the new medium. The three-minute single remained the standard into the 1960s, when the availability of microgroove recording and improved mastering techniques enabled recording artists to increase the duration of their recorded songs. The breakthrough came with Bob Dylan's "Like a Rolling Stone": although Columbia Records tried to make the record more "radio-friendly" by cutting the performance into halves and separating them between the two sides of the disc, both Dylan and his fans demanded that the full six-minute take be placed on one side and that radio stations play the song in its entirety.

Types of physical singles
Singles have been issued in various formats, including , 10-inch and 12-inch discs, usually playing at 45 rpm; 10-inch shellac discs, playing at 78 rpm; maxi singles; 7-inch plastic flexi discs; cassettes; and  CD singles. Other, less common, formats include singles on Digital Compact Cassette, DVD and Laserdisc, as well as many non-standard sizes of vinyl disc (etc.).

Up until mid-1970s, British single releases were packaged in generic paper sleeves. Limited editions containing picture sleeves sold well around that period, so the number of UK singles packaged in picture sleeves increased thereafter. In 1992, cassette and CD singles surpassed 7-inch vinyls.

7-inch format

The most common form of the vinyl single is the "45" or "7-inch". The names are derived from its play speed, 45 rpm (revolutions per minute), and the standard diameter, .

The 7-inch 45 rpm record was released March 31, 1949, by RCA Victor as a smaller, more durable and higher-fidelity replacement for the 78 rpm shellac discs. The first 45 rpm records were monaural, with recordings on both sides of the disc. As stereo recordings became popular in the 1960s, almost all 45 rpm records were produced in stereo by the early 1970s. Columbia Records, which had released the  rpm 12-inch vinyl LP in June 1948, also released  rpm 7-inch vinyl singles in March 1949, but they were soon eclipsed by the RCA Victor 45. The first regular production 45 rpm record pressed was "PeeWee the Piccolo": RCA Victor 47-0146 pressed December 7, 1948 at the Sherman Avenue plant in Indianapolis; R.O. Price, plant manager.

The claim made that 48-0001 by Eddy Arnold was the first 45 is evidently incorrect (even though 48-0000 has not turned up, 50-0000-Crudup, 51-0000-Meisel, and 52-0000 Goodman are out there) since all 45s were released simultaneously with the 45 player in March 1949. There was plenty of information leaked to the public about the new 45 rpm system through front-page articles in Billboard magazine on December 4, 1948, and again on January 8, 1949. RCA was trying to blunt the lead Columbia had established upon releasing their   LP system in June 1948.
 
To compete with Columbia, RCA released albums as boxes of 45 rpm seven-inch singles that could be played continuously like an LP on their record changer. RCA was also releasing 7-inch singles pressed in different colors for different genres, making it easy for customers to find their preferred music. The novelty of multicolored singles wore off soon: by 1952, all RCA singles were pressed in black vinyl.

The lightweight and inexpensive 45 rpm discs introduced by RCA were quickly popular and in the early 1950s all major US labels had begun manufacturing seven-inch singles.
In some regions (e.g. US), the default hole size fitted the original RCA  hub which, due to a format war, was incompatible with the  spindle of a Columbia-system 33 1/3 RPM 12-inch LP player. In other regions (e.g. UK), the default was a small hole compatible with a multi-speed 0.25-inch spindle player, but with a "knock out" that was removed for usage on a larger hub player.

One could play a large-hole record on a player with a quarter-inch spindle by inserting a single "puck" or by using a spindle adapter.

12-inch format

Although 7 inches remained the standard size for vinyl singles, 12-inch singles were introduced for use by DJs in discos in the 1970s. The longer playing time of these singles allowed the inclusion of extended dance mixes of tracks. In addition, the larger surface area of the 12-inch discs allowed for wider grooves (larger amplitude) and greater separation between grooves, the latter of which results in less cross-talk. Consequently, they are less susceptible to wear and scratches. The 12-inch single is still considered a standard format for dance music, though its popularity has declined in recent years.

Digital era
As digital downloading and audio streaming have become more prevalent, it has become possible for every track on an album to also be available separately. Nevertheless, the concept of a single from an album has been retained as an identification of the more heavily promoted or more popular songs on an album. The demand for music downloads skyrocketed after the launch of Apple's iTunes Store (then called iTunes Music Store) in January 2001 and the creation of portable music and digital audio players such as the iPod.

In September 1997, with the release of Duran Duran's "Electric Barbarella" for paid downloads, Capitol Records became the first major label to sell a digital single from a well-known artist. Previously, Geffen Records also released Aerosmith's "Head First" digitally for free. In 2004, the Recording Industry Association of America (RIAA) introduced digital single certification due to significant sales of digital formats, with Gwen Stefani's "Hollaback Girl" becoming RIAA's first platinum digital single. In 2013, RIAA incorporated on-demand streams into the digital single certification.

Single sales in the United Kingdom reached an all-time low in January 2005, as the popularity of the compact disc was overtaken by the then-unofficial medium of the music download. Recognizing this, on 17 April 2005, Official UK Singles Chart added the download format to the existing format of physical CD singles. Gnarls Barkley was the first act to reach No.1 on this chart through downloads alone in April 2006, for their debut single "Crazy", which was released physically the following week. On 1 January 2007, digital downloads (including unbundled album tracks) became eligible from the point of release, without the need for an accompanying physical. Sales gradually improved in the following years, reaching a record high in 2008 that still proceeded to be overtaken in 2009, 2010 and 2011.

In the late 2010s, artists began a trend of releasing multiple singles before eventually releasing a studio album. An unnamed A&R representative confirmed to Rolling Stone in 2018 that "an artist has to build a foundation to sustain" and added that "When artists have one big record and go run with that, it doesn't work because they never had a foundation to begin with." The same article cited examples such as Cardi B, Camila Cabello and Jason Derulo releasing four or more singles prior to their album releases.

Culture

The sales of singles are recorded in record charts in most countries in a Top 40 format. The charts are often published in magazines and numerous television shows and radio programs count down the list. To be eligible for inclusion in charts, the single must meet the requirement set by the charting company that governs the playing time of the single.

In popular music, the commercial and artistic importance of the single (as compared to the EP or album) has varied over time, technological development, and according to the audience of particular artists and genres. Singles have generally been more important to artists who sell to the youngest purchasers of music (younger teenagers and pre-teens), who tend to have more limited financial resources.

Starting in the mid-1960s, albums became a greater focus and became more important as artists created albums of uniformly high-quality and coherent themes, a trend that reached its apex in the development of the concept album. Over the 1990s and the early 2000s, the single generally received less and less attention in the United States as albums, which on compact disc had virtually identical production and distribution costs but could be sold at a higher price, became most retailers' primary method of selling music. Singles continued to be produced in the UK and Australia and survived the transition from compact disc to digital download. The decline of the physical single in the US during this time has been cited as a major marketing mistake on the part of record companies, as it eliminated an inexpensive recording format for young fans to become accustomed to purchasing music. In its place was the predominance of the album, which alienated customers by the expense of purchasing a longer format for only one or two songs of interest. That in turn encouraged interest in file sharing software on the internet like Napster for single recordings, which began to undercut the music recording market.

Dance music, however, has followed a different commercial pattern and the single, especially the 12-inch vinyl single, remains a major method by which dance music is distributed.

Another development of the 2000s was the popularity of mobile phone ringtones based on pop singles. In September 2007, Sony BMG announced that it would introduce a new type of CD single, called "ringles", for the 2007 holiday season. The format included three songs by an artist, plus a ringtone accessible from the user's computer. Sony announced plans to release 50 singles in October and November, and Universal Music Group expected to release somewhere between 10 and 20 titles. In a reversal of this trend, a single has been released based on a ringtone itself: the Crazy Frog ringtone, which was a cult hit in Europe in 2004, was released as a mashup with "Axel F" in June 2005 amid a massive publicity campaign and subsequently hit No. 1 on the UK chart.

The term single is sometimes regarded as a misnomer since one record usually contains two songs: the A-side and B-side. In 1982, CBS marketed one-sided singles at a lower price than two-sided singles.

In South Korea

In South Korean music, the terminology for "albums" and "singles" is unique and includes an additional term, the single album. In contemporary usage in English, the term "album" refers to an LP-length recording regardless of the medium, but in contrast, the Korean usage of "album" denotes a musical recording of any length released specifically on physical media. Although the terms "single albums" and "singles" are similar and sometimes may overlap, depending on the context, they are considered two distinct release types in South Korea. A "single album" refers to a physical release (like CD, LP or some other media) collecting one or more singles, while a "single" is only a song itself, typically a digital stream or download.

The Gaon Album Chart tracks sales of all "offline" albums released as physical media and so single albums compete alongside full-length studio albums (LPs) and mini-albums (EPs). The Gaon Digital Chart, which tracks downloads and streams, is regarded as the official "singles" chart.

As a distinct release type, the single album developed during the CD era in the 1990s. Single albums, typically including about two or three songs, were marketed as a more affordable alternative to a full-length CD album. The term "single album" is sometimes used to refer to a release that would simply be called a "single" in Western contexts, such as a 7-inch 45rpm record released before the advent of downloadable music.

To give an example of the differences between full-length albums, single albums and singles, the K-pop boy band Big Bang has a full-length studio album, titled MADE, which was originally released as a series of four single albums: M, A, D and E. Two singles were included on each of those single albums; the first in the series, M, contains the singles "Loser" and "Bae Bae".

A single album is distinct from a single even if it includes only one song. The single "Gotta Go" by Chungha was released on a single album titled XII, which was a one-track CD. Even though "Gotta Go" was the only song on XII, the two releases carry different titles and charted separately: XII reached No.4 on the Gaon Album Chart, and "Gotta Go" reached No.2 on the Gaon Digital Chart.

See also
 Gramophone record
 Lead single
 List of best-selling singles

References

Further reading
  
 
 
 Carson, B. H.; Burt, A. D.; Reiskind, H. I., "A Record Changer and Record of Complementary Design", RCA Review, June 1949
  

 
Audio storage